Carl Gary Greenidge (born 20 April 1978) is an English cricketer. He is a right-handed batsman and a right-arm medium-fast bowler. He was born in Basingstoke, Hampshire, the son of Gordon Greenidge.

Greenidge played for Gloucestershire and has in the past represented both Northamptonshire and Surrey. He has played Twenty20 cricket since 2004. In 2000, he was a candidate for Cricket Writers' Young Cricketer Of The Year.

He currently (2012) works as a cricket coach at Bancroft's School along with John Lever. Together they run the 1st XI and he has led many Sports tours abroad. He also coaches basketball.

Carl Greenidge played the role of his father, Gordon, in the bollywood film 83.

References

External links
 

1978 births
Living people
Cricketers from Basingstoke
English cricketers
English sportspeople of Barbadian descent
Gloucestershire cricketers
Northamptonshire cricketers
Surrey cricketers